Adam Sandurski (born 8 February 1953) is a retired heavyweight freestyle wrestler from Poland. He competed at the 1980 and 1988 Summer Olympics, winning a bronze medal in 1980. Between 1979 and 1986, he won three silver and six bronze medals at the world and European championships.

References

External links 
 
 
 

1953 births
Living people
People from Rzeszów County
Olympic wrestlers of Poland
Wrestlers at the 1980 Summer Olympics
Wrestlers at the 1988 Summer Olympics
Polish male sport wrestlers
Olympic bronze medalists for Poland
Olympic medalists in wrestling
Sportspeople from Podkarpackie Voivodeship
Medalists at the 1980 Summer Olympics
World Wrestling Championships medalists
European Wrestling Championships medalists
20th-century Polish people
21st-century Polish people